Elections to the Nevada Assembly will be held on November 5, 2024. Elections will also be held in the state for U.S. President, U.S. Senate, U.S. House of Representatives, and for the Nevada Senate.

Primary elections will be held on June 11, 2024.

See also 
 2024 Nevada elections

References

Assembly
Nevada Assembly
Nevada State Assembly elections